Lyford Cay (foaled 1954 in Ontario) was a Canadian Thoroughbred Gelding racehorse who in 1957 won the 98th running of the Queen's Plate, Canada's most prestigious race and North America's oldest annually run stakes race.

Background

Out of the mare, Famous Maid, Lyford Cay's sire was Canadian Horse Racing Hall of Fame inductee and sire of four Queen's Plate winners, Chop Chop. Bred by prominent breeder/owner E. P. Taylor, in 1955 the unnamed yearling was purchased by Jim Boylen at Taylor's annual yearling sale but Boylen soon came to believe the horse had knee problems and returned him.   Before turning him over to trainer "Pete" McCann, Taylor named the colt for Lyford Cay on New Providence Island in the Bahamas, an exclusive residential community developed by Taylor and where he maintained a home.

Racing career
In the two top races of 1956 for Canadian Juveniles, Lyford Cay finished second in the Coronation Futurity Stakes and third in the Cup and Saucer Stakes. As a three-year-old, Lyford Cay won the Plate Trial Stakes and then on June 8, the Queen's Plate itself, capturing the mile and a quarter event in track record time of 2:02 3/5. Later that month he won the Woodstock Stakes following the disqualification of winner, Pink Velvet.

Pedigree

References
 Lyford Cay's pedigree and partial racing stats
 June 9, 1957 New York Times article on Lyford Cay winning the Queen's Plate

1954 racehorse births
Racehorses bred in Ontario
Racehorses trained in Canada
King's Plate winners
Thoroughbred family 5-d